The Fedorovych uprising was a rebellion headed by Taras Fedorovych against the Polish–Lithuanian Commonwealth in 1630.

The uprising
In March 1630 Fedorovych became the leader of a Cossack and peasant revolt which became known as the Fedorovych Uprising. The 1625 Treaty of Kurukove, also known as the Treaty of Lake Kurukowe, had been signed by Doroshenko and restricted the number of registered Cossacks to only six thousand. Dissatisfied with these conditions the remaining forty thousand unregistered Cossacks joined the resistance.

The uprising was ignited by the continually increasing enserfment and exploitation of the Ukrainian peasantry by mostly Polish szlachta (nobility) of the Polish–Lithuanian Commonwealth, or their polonized equivalents, as well as the imposition of Catholicism on the unwilling Ukrainians who had been traditionally Eastern Orthodox.

About ten thousand rebels proceeded from the Zaporizhian Sich towards the upper Dnieper territories overrunning the Polish forces stationed there. The rebels captured and executed the Hetman of the registered Cossacks Hryhoriy Chorny for his pro-Polish stance and support of the Union of Brest. The rebels came to an agreement on their new leadership by nominating Fedorovych for the position of Hetman. 

Fedorovych addressed the Ukrainian commoners with several Universal acts and called upon everyone to join his uprising against the Polish usurpers. The turbulence spread over the nearby territories with many Cossacks and peasants rising against the local Polish nobles as well as wealthy Jewish landowners who, despite their limited involvement in the local power structure, were also resented. 

As clashes increased casualties rose on both sides. After victory at Korsun-Shevchenkivskyi over the Polish army sent against them the rebel Cossacks controlled a large territory that included Korsun, Kaniv and other cities making their main base at Pereiaslav. 

In response to their successes a large Polish army led by Stanisław Koniecpolski was sent to confront the Cossacks. The army, strengthened by German mercenary forces, was harassed by the rebels and in turn  plundered and massacred Lysianka, Dymer and several other Ukrainian settlements It then crossed the Dnieper where they were met by the rebels, both front and rear, as more Ukrainians rose in what became an area-wide rebellion against the Poles. The skirmishes around Pereiaslav lasted three weeks until the  indecisive battle at Pereiaslav. Koniecpolski laid siege to the Cossack stronghold but lacking the support of artillery and infantry he could not break its walls. The Cossacks were also lacking supplies and agreed to negotiations.

Negotiations
Fedorovych's military successes forced Koniecpolski to initiate negotiations with the Cossack leadership (the Starshyna) which concluded with the Treaty of Pereiaslav in 1630. Many of the demands of the non-registered Cossacks and their leader Fedorovych were discarded in the treaty by other Cossack Starshynas. The main requirement voiced by Fedorovych and his supporters was that the Cossack privileges routinely guaranteed to the limited number of registered Cossacks should be granted to all runaway peasants who claimed Cossackdom. This was rejected and in a narrow compromise the Cossack register was enlarged from six to eight thousand. In return Koniecpolski demanded that Fedorovych be delivered into Polish custody. 

Fedorovych, uncertain of the decision that would have been reached, was in over his head with the "compromising" faction of Cossack leadership. He left Pereiaslav along with other Cossacks dissatisfied with the agreement and they headed for the Cossack stronghold of the Zaporizhian Sich. The Starshyna faction who had agreed to a compromise with Poland elected Timofiy Orendarenko and his Hetmanship was confirmed with Koniecpolski's agreement. Fedorovych, disgruntled with this turn of events, tried to raise the Cossack masses to start a new uprising but the energy for such an undertaking was no longer forthcoming.

References
 

Conflicts in 1630
Cossack uprisings
17th-century rebellions
1630 in Europe
Rebellions in Ukraine
Wars involving the Grand Duchy of Lithuania
Wars involving Poland
1630 in the Polish–Lithuanian Commonwealth
17th century in the Zaporozhian Host